Ramiz Ahmed (born July 27, 1995) is an American football kicker who is a free agent. He played college football at Nevada. He signed with the Chicago Bears as an undrafted free agent in 2020 but was released prior to the season. He previously played for the Pittsburgh Maulers of the United States Football League (USFL) in 2022 and currently holds the record for the longest field goal made in USFL history (61 yards).

High school career
A Las Vegas native, Ahmed originally attended Faith Lutheran High School, where he played on the varsity soccer team as a freshman. He did not play football until his second year, when he transferred to Bishop Gorman High School and joined their team as a kicker. Ahmed was the starter on the 2013 state championship team, making 6-of-11 field goals, 71-of-74 PATs and hitting 67 touchbacks in 93 attempts.

College career
Ahmed first attended the University of Nevada, Las Vegas (UNLV) before transferring to Arizona State University (ASU), though he did not play football at either school. Ahmed transferred again in January 2017, this time to the University of Nevada, Reno, where he made the Wolf Pack football team as a walk-on. Though he struggled with inconsistency on field goals, Ahmed's powerful right leg caught the team's attention at a student tryout conducted six days before the season opener. "He came out just banging the ball, just destroying it," said special teams coordinator Tommy Perry, who compared his kicks to "a shotgun going off." By this time a junior, Ahmed had to wait a few weeks to get cleared before making his college debut as the Wolf Pack's starting kickoff specialist in their second game against Toledo. He recorded three touchbacks in three attempts and was named the team's special teams player of the week for his performance. In total, Ahmed had 28 touchbacks in 55 attempts and earned academic all-conference honors in his first season.

During his senior year, Ahmed became the starting kicker. He made 15 of 20 field goals and 40 of 44 PATs.

Professional career

Chicago Bears
On April 17, 2020, he signed with the Chicago Bears as competition for Eddy Piñeiro. On August 11, Ahmed was waived, making Piñeiro the Bears' kicker for the 2020 season.

Pittsburgh Maulers
On March 10, 2022, Ahmed was drafted by the Pittsburgh Maulers of the United States Football League in the seventh round of the 2022 USFL Supplemental Draft.

In Week 8, Ahmed made a 61-yard field goal against the New Jersey Generals, marking as the longest field goal in USFL history.

Green Bay Packers
On August 14, 2022, Ahmed signed with the Green Bay Packers. He was waived on August 30, 2022. He was signed to the practice squad on September 5, 2022. On November 12, 2022, he was elevated to the active roster for the game against the Dallas Cowboys. He handled kickoffs as starter Mason Crosby dealt with a sore back, kicking off six times, three of which going for touchbacks. On November 14, 2022, Ahmed was reverted back to the Packers practice squad. On December 31, 2022, Ahmed was elevated to the active roster from the practice squad. During warm-ups for the team's week seventeen game against the Minnesota Vikings Ahmed suffered a groin injury and did not play during the game despite being elevated to once again handle kickoff duties. After the game on January 2, 2023, Ahmed returned to the team's practice squad while the team signed fellow kicker Matt Ammendola. On January 16, 2023, Ahmed's contract with the team expired.

References

External links
Nevada Wolf Pack bio

Further reading

Living people
Players of American football from Nevada
Sportspeople from Las Vegas
American football placekickers
University of Nevada, Las Vegas alumni
Arizona State University alumni
Nevada Wolf Pack football players
Chicago Bears players
Pittsburgh Maulers (2022) players
Green Bay Packers players
1995 births